The 2014 Cork Senior Football Championship was the 127th staging of the Cork Senior Football Championship since its establishment by the Cork County Board in 1887. The draw for the opening round fixtures took place on 14 December 2014. The championship began on 6 April 2015 and ended on 25 October 2015.

Ballincollig were the defending champions, however, they were defeated by Castlehaven at the quarter-final stage.

On 25 October 2015, Nemo Rangers won the championship following a 1-10 to 0-11 defeat of Castlehaven in a final replay at Páirc Uí Rinn. It was their 19th championship title overall and their first title since 2010.

Team changes

To Championship

Promoted from the Cork Premier Intermediate Football Championship
 Valley Rovers

From Championship

Relegated to the Cork Premier Intermediate Football Championship
 St. Vincent's

Results

Divisional section

Round 1

Round 2

Round 3

Relegation playoff

Round 4

Quarter-finals

Semi-finals

Finals

Championship statistics

Top scorers

Top scorers overall

Top scorers in a single game

Miscellaneous
 Nemo Rangers win their first title since 2010.

References

External links

Cork Senior Football Championship
Cork Senior Football Championship